Russia is divided into several types and levels of subdivisions.

Federal subjects

Since 30 September 2022, the Russian Federation has consisted of eighty-nine federal subjects that are constituent members of the Federation. However, six of these federal subjects—the Republic of Crimea, the Donetsk People's Republic, the Kherson Oblast, the Lugansk People's Republic, the federal city of Sevastopol and the Zaporozhye Oblast—are internationally recognized as part of Ukraine. All federal subjects are of equal federal rights in the sense that they have equal representation—two delegates each—in the Federation Council (upper house of the Federal Assembly). They do, however, differ in the degree of autonomy they enjoy.

De jure, there are 6 types of federal subjects—24 republics, 9 krais, 48 oblasts, 3 federal cities, 1 autonomous oblast, and 4 autonomous okrugs.

Autonomous okrugs are the only ones that have a peculiar status of being federal subjects in their own right, yet at the same time they are considered to be administrative divisions of other federal subjects (with Chukotka Autonomous Okrug being the only exception).

Status of the Ukrainian territories occupied by Russia
On 18 March 2014, as a part of the annexation of Crimea and following the establishment of the Republic of Crimea (an independent entity that was only recognized by Russia), a treaty was signed between Russia and the Republic of Crimea incorporating the Republic of Crimea and the City of Sevastopol as the constituent members of the Russian Federation. According to the Treaty, the Republic of Crimea is accepted as a federal subject with the status of a republic while the City of Sevastopol has received federal city status. Neither the Republic of Crimea nor the city of Sevastopol are politically recognized as parts of Russia by international law and most countries.

Similarly, Russia also annexed four Ukrainian oblasts of Donetsk, Kherson, Luhansk and Zaporozhzhia on 30 September 2022 after internationally-unrecognized referendums held days prior, during the invasion of Ukraine that began in late February, which were organized by Russian occupation authorities in territories where hostilities were ongoing and much of the population had fled. It occurred seven months after the start of the invasion and less than a month after the start of the Ukrainian Kharkiv counteroffensive. The signing ceremony was held in the Grand Kremlin Palace in Moscow in the presence of occupation authority heads Leonid Pasechnik, Denis Pushilin, Yevgeny Balitsky and Vladimir Saldo, and Russian president Vladimir Putin. Like Crimea, neither the four occupied regions are internationally recognized as part of Russia as such.

Administrative divisions
Prior to the adoption of the 1993 Constitution of Russia, the administrative-territorial structure of Russia was regulated by the Decree of the Presidium of the Supreme Soviet of the RSFSR of 17 August 1982 "On the Procedures of Dealing with the Matters of the Administrative-Territorial Structure of the RSFSR". The 1993 Constitution, however, did not identify the matters of the administrative-territorial divisions as the responsibility of the federal government nor as the joint responsibility of the federal government and the subjects. This was interpreted by the governments of the federal subjects as a sign that the matters of the administrative-territorial divisions became solely the responsibility of the federal subjects. As a result, the modern administrative-territorial structures of the federal subjects vary significantly from one federal subject to another. While the implementation details may be considerably different, in general, however, the following types of high-level administrative divisions are recognized:
administrative districts (raions)
cities/towns and urban-type settlements of federal subject significance
closed administrative-territorial formations

Autonomous okrugs and okrugs are intermediary units of administrative divisions, which include some of the federal subject's districts and cities/towns/urban-type settlements of federal subject significance.
Autonomous okrugs, while being under the jurisdiction of another federal subject, are still constitutionally recognized as federal subjects on their own right. Chukotka Autonomous Okrug is an exception in that it is not administratively subordinated to any other federal subject of Russia.
Okrugs are usually former autonomous okrugs that lost their federal subject status due to a merger with another federal subject.

Typical lower-level administrative divisions include:
selsoviets (rural councils)
towns and urban-type settlements of the administrative district significance
city districts

Municipal divisions

In the course of the Russian municipal reform of 2004–2005, all federal subjects of Russia were to streamline the structures of local self-government, which is guaranteed by the Constitution of Russia. The reform mandated that each federal subject was to have a unified structure of municipal government bodies by 1 January 2005, and a law enforcing the reform provisions went in effect on 1 January 2006. According to the law, the units of the municipal division (called "municipal formations") are as follows:
Municipal district, a group of urban and rural settlements, often along with the inter-settlement territories. In practice, municipal districts are usually formed within the boundaries of existing administrative districts (raions).
Urban settlement, a city/town or an urban-type settlement, possibly together with adjacent rural and/or urban localities
Rural settlement, one or several rural localities
Urban okrug, an urban settlement not incorporated into a municipal district. In practice, urban okrugs are usually formed within the boundaries of existing cities of federal subject significance.
Intra-urban territory (intra-urban municipal formation) of a federal city, a part of a federal city's territory. In Moscow, these are called municipal formations (which correspond to districts); in St. Petersburg—municipal okrugs, towns, and settlements. In Sevastopol (located on the Crimean Peninsula, which is a territory disputed between Russia and Ukraine), they are known as municipal okrugs and a town.

Territories not included as a part of municipal formations are known as inter-settlement territories.

The Federal Law was amended on 27 May 2014 to include new types of municipal divisions:
Urban okrug with intra-urban divisions, an urban okrug divided into intra-urban districts at the lower level of the municipal hierarchy
Intra-urban district, a municipal formation within an urban okrug with intra-urban divisions. This municipal formation type would typically be established within the borders of existing city districts (i.e., the administrative divisions in some of the cities of federal subject significance).

In June 2014, Chelyabinsky Urban Okrug became the first urban okrug to implement intra-urban divisions.

Federal legislation introduced on May 1, 2019, added an additional territorial unit:
Municipal okrug, a grouping of several settlements without municipal status. Municipal okrugs formally exercise local self-government either through direct means or through electoral and other institutions.

Other types of subdivisions

Federal districts

All of the federal subjects are grouped into eight federal districts, each administered by an envoy appointed by the President of Russia.  Federal districts' envoys serve as liaisons between the federal subjects and the federal government and are primarily responsible for overseeing the compliance of the federal subjects with the federal laws.

Economic regions

For economic and statistical purposes the federal subjects are grouped into twelve economic regions.  Economic regions and their parts sharing common economic trends are in turn grouped into economic zones and macrozones.

Military districts

In order for the Armed Forces to provide an efficient management of military units, their training, and other operational activities, the federal subjects are grouped into five military districts. Each military district operates under the command of the district headquarters, headed by the district commander, and is subordinated to the General Staff of the Armed Forces of the Russian Federation.

See also
History of the administrative division of Russia
List of federal subjects of Russia by area
List of federal subjects of Russia by population
Types of inhabited localities in Russia
Republics of the Soviet Union
Constituencies of Russia

References

Sources

External links
Local government in Russia: Its powers vary across the country at Citymayors.com 

 
Russia
Russia
History of Russia (1991–present)
Russia geography-related lists